Bruncor, based in Saint John, New Brunswick was a Canadian telecommunications holding company and the parent company of NBTel.

Bruncor merged in 1999 with 3 other telecommunication companies in Atlantic Canada to form Aliant (now Bell Aliant).

Aliant Telecom makes the transition to Bell Aliant.

The Bell Nordique Fund.

Bell Aliant issues a press release regarding Bell Nordique in 2006.

Bell Aliant issues an annual report for 2006.

The Bell Nordique Fund is privatized in 2007.

Present COO and Director of former Aliant Inc, Karen Sheriff is announced as the replacement for Stephen Wetmore. Ms. Sheriff becomes the new president and CEO of Bell Aliant on November 3, 2008.

Bell Aliant Regional Communications Income Fund reports activities for 2009.

Bell Aliant is noted in the BCE Annual report for 2012.

A Bell Aliant dividend  is to be paid on December 13, 2013, according to news from Reuters.

Acquisitions

On Monday, March 22, 1999 a merger agreement is announced which would affect four major Atlantic Canadian companies and their 9,000 employees. The closing date for the merger is set for May 31, 1999.

Under "AtlanticCo" (3595641 Canada Inc.), the four major Atlantic Canada telecommunications companies would merge under one new $3B Communications Company to become the third largest of its type in Canada and one of the largest mobile satellite services in North America.

The merged companies would include:

Maritime Telegraph and Telephone Company Ltd of Nova Scotia (holder of Maritime Tel & Tel Limited, MT&T Mobility Inc., MT&T Leasing Inc. and MT&T Holdings Inc.)

Bruncor Inc.,  (TSE, ME: BRR)  (Including NBTel, NBTel Mobility, MITI Information Technology Inc. (MITI), ImagicTV Inc., New North Media, NBTel Global Inc., and Connectivity Managed Network Services Ltd. )

NewTel Enterprises Ltd. (TSE:NEL) of Newfoundland  (Including NewTel Communications, NewTel Mobility, xwave solutions, Stratos Global Corporation, AMI Offshore, and NewTech Instruments)

Island Telecom Inc. of Prince Edward Island (with subsidiary Island Tel Advanced Solutions Inc. (ITAS))

Senior Management of the new Company  are named as

Stephen G. Wetmore - President & CEO

Lino Celeste - Chairman

Colin Latham - Telecommunications

Gerald (Gerry) Pond -  IT and Emerging Business

Robert (Bob) H. Benson - CFO

William (Bill) H. Steeves - Corporate Services

Maritime Internet Services 
Maritime Internet Services Inc., otherwise known as MIS, was an Internet service provider (ISP) that operated in the Canadian province of New Brunswick. It was founded in October 1994 by four principals, which included Derek Billinglsey, Andrew Chase, Andrew Miller and Donald Trynor. In October 1996, it was acquired by Bruncor, the parent company of NBTel, which operated as the largest telecommunications company in New Brunswick at the time. During the period of its existence, MIS had grown to become the second largest ISP in New Brunswick, with service available in Saint John, Fredericton, Moncton and St. Stephen.

MIS operated several Internet domain names during its existence. These included MI.NET, MIS.NB.CA and MIS.CA. Initially, MIS obtained Internet connectivity from Hookup Communications of Oakville, ON via a 56 kbit/s frame relay connection. This was subsequently upgraded to a 128 kbit/s connection via Insinc then to a T1 connection into the local CA*Net connection in Fredericton, NB, peering with the Educational Computer Network (ECN) and NBTel.

Prior to its subsequent purchase by Bruncor, MIS enjoyed a veritable cult following among its customer base.

Partnership
Bell Aliant Regional Communications Inc, limited partner 6583458 Canada Inc. and CRTC Broadcast decision.

Questions
Respondents contest a Plan of Arrangement and ask the "in whose best interest" question.

References

Telecommunications companies of Canada
Defunct companies of New Brunswick
Companies based in Saint John, New Brunswick
Bell Aliant